Deuel Vocational Institution (DVI) was a state prison located in unincorporated San Joaquin County, California, near Tracy. The prison closed on September 30, 2021.

Facilities
 
DVI opened in 1953 and named for California state senator Charles H. Deuel, who sponsored legislation establishing the institution.  The facility has been expanded and reorganized several times, in 1959, 1981 and 1993. Its current head warden is J. Price.

As of April 30, 2020, DVI was incarcerating people at 121.8% of its design capacity, with 2,047 occupants.

In 1956 the Mexican Mafia was established at Deuel.

One purpose of DVI was to serve as a reception center for newly committed prisoners to the California Department of Corrections and Rehabilitation from northern California county jails. The facility also housed "mainline" inmates classified by CDCR as levels II and III. There was also a minimum security "ranch" that supports a dairy.  As of January 2006, the total count of prisoners at DVI was 3,748, with 3,162 of that number assigned to the reception center.

As a result of DVI's primary function as a reception center, in which a large number of felons of different propensities for violence, disciplinary and security issues pass through before being classified and transferred to other facilities, DVI has a long-standing reputation for being violent and dangerous.  The facility used to be referred to as "gladiator school" by inmates and staff, because the DVI was widely known for the fights and homicides that took place within the prison walls.

As recently as June 2010, an inmate murder in the facility has been recorded.

DVI also had a 110-inmate farm and operate a 1200-cow dairy. They grew cattle grain and supply milk to other state prisons and tax-supported public agencies.

Notable inmates
Rodolfo Cadena (1943-1972), mob boss; later stabbed to death in another prison
Diego Corrales (1977-2007), boxer; served 14 months for assault
Fleeta Drumgo (1945-1979), member of the San Quentin Six; served time for attempted murder
Rene "Boxer" Enriquez (born 1962), gang member; later sent to Pelican Bay State Prison in 1993
Joe Fong (born 1954/5), former gang member; released in 1979
Glen Stewart Godwin (born 1958), murderer; later transferred to Folsom State Prison
Clem Grogan (born 1951), Manson family member
Gary Steven Krist, most notable for the Barbara Mackle kidnapping in 1968, briefly escaped from DVI in 1966
Chol Soo Lee (1952-2014), immigrant wrongfully convicted of murder; later transferred to San Quentin State Penitentiary for killing an inmate; acquitted in 1983
Robert Maxfield (born c.1978), convicted for the murder of Yetunde Price; served 12 years before being released on parole
George U. Powell (1933-2012), murderer; died at California Medical Facility
Craig V. Smith (1945-2012), musician; sentenced for trying to kill his mother; served time in several prisons, including DVI; paroled in 1976
Raymond Washington (1953-1979), gangster and Crips gang founder; served 5 years for robbery
Melvin Yu, one of the perpetrators of the Golden Dragon massacre; released from Solano State Prison in 2015

See also

 List of California state prisons

References

External links
DVI official website
California Department of Corrections and Rehabilitation Official website

1953 establishments in California
Buildings and structures in San Joaquin County, California
Prisons in California
Tracy, California